Saeed Saleh also credited as Sa'eed Saleh Ibrahim; (July 31, 1940 – August 1, 2014) was an Egyptian comedian actor.

Biography
Saleh earned his bachelor of arts degree from Cairo University in 1960. He is most famous for his theatre roles in Al Ayal Kibrit and Madrast Al-Mushaghebeen along as acting in almost one third of the Egyptian movies making him the most actor to act in films in the world. In 1974, he acted with Salah Zulfikar in In Summer We Must Love.

He was imprisoned in November 1995 for one year, due to his possession of drugs. In 2010, he acted with Adel Emam in Alzheimer's film, while suffering from Alzheimer's disease.

He died in 2014 and was buried in his hometown, Majiria, Monufia Governorate.

Filmography
 Qasr El Shouq (1966)
 Witch (1971) – TV short
 In Summer We Must Love (1974)
 Dunya (1974)
 Shouq (1976)
 Laiali Yasmeen (1978)
 Al Mashbouh (1981)
 Ala Bab El Wazeer (1982)
 Gabroat Imraa (1984)
 Nos arnab (1985)
 Ibn Tahya Azouz (1986)
 Salam Ya Sahby (1987)
 Fatwat EL Salakhana (1989)
 El Sa'ayda Gom (1989)
 Almshaghebon Fe Noabae (1992)
 El Lee'b A'la El Makshouf (1993)
 Al-Suqout Fi Bir Sabe (1994) 
 Belia We Demagho El Aliaa (2000)
 Ameer Al-Zalaam (2002)
 Zahaimar (2010)
 Metaab wa Shadya (2012)

Plays
 Ka'abaloon (1985)
Madrast Al-Mushaghebeen (1973)
Al Ayal Kibrit (1979)
Hallo Shalabi (1969)

TV series

 Ahlam Alfata Altaaer (1978)
 Bel Alwan ElTabeaya (2009)
 9 Gameat El Dowal (2012)
 Al Morafa'a (2014)

See also 
 List of Egyptians

References

External links 
 
 Said Saleh at ElCinema.com (Arabic)

1940 births
2014 deaths
Egyptian male film actors
Egyptian comedians
Cairo University alumni
People from Monufia Governorate